Harri Moora  ( in Ehavere, Kuremaa Parish – 2 May 1968 in Tallinn) was an Estonian archaeologist. He was a recipient of the national Cross of Liberty.

In 1925, he graduated from the University of Tartu. Between 1930–1942, he was a museum director. In 1931, he studied at Baltic Institute in Stockholm and developed a scholarly working relationship with Finnish archaeologist Ella Kivikoski, who was one of his main contacts with Scandinavian archaeologists.

He worked at Tartu University during World War II but was arrested in 1944; he resumed his post at the university after the war. He worked at the Institute of History and Archaeology as the department head until his death.

From 1936 to 1950 he was Chairman of the Estonian Learned Society and a member of the International Union of the History of Science.

He was married to Aliise Moora, an ethnologist, and they had six children, two of whom became well known academics. Tanel Moora became an archaeologist and Ann Marksoo a geographer. Harri Moora's grandsons are politician Jürgen Ligi and archeologist Priit Ligi.

After Moora's death, two other Estonian archaeologists, Lembit Jaanits and Jüri Selirand co-authored a book in his memory, Studia archaeologica in memoriam Harri Moora, published in 1970.

References

info.raad.tartu.ee 

1900 births
1968 deaths
People from Jõgeva Parish
People from the Governorate of Livonia
Estonian archaeologists
University of Tartu alumni
Members of the Estonian Academy of Sciences
Estonian military personnel of the Estonian War of Independence
20th-century archaeologists